Fenway South is the spring training base of the Boston Red Sox in Fort Myers, Florida.

The purpose-built training and player development complex is used year-round by the Red Sox and its minor league farm teams—Worcester Red Sox, Portland Sea Dogs, Greenville Drive, and Salem Red Sox—and includes an 11,000-seat stadium and an additional six baseball fields together with training and medical facilities. As the spring training home of Red Sox, it replaced nearby City of Palms Park.

The stadium within Fenway South is called JetBlue Park, through sponsorship by JetBlue Airways, which has maintained major operations at Boston's Logan International Airport since 2004. 

The complex was officially opened by the Lee County Board of Commissioners and the Red Sox on February 25, 2012.

Facilities
There are six baseball training fields and two soccer fields in the complex, available year-round by the Red Sox and their farm clubs. Baseball field No. 1 has the same field dimensions as JetBlue Park and Fenway Park. Fields 1, 2, and 4 are set in the same direction as JetBlue Park, with 3, 4, 5, and 6 sharing a backstop facility.

The complex is served via a private road from the local fire department station (Lee County #64).

The move to Fenway South
The Red Sox's lease on City of Palms Park with Fort Myers ran through 2019, however team ownership exercised an early out in the contract that allowed them to leave following the 2009 spring season. Chief operating officer Mike Dee met with Sarasota officials on April 25, 2008 to discuss the possibility of the Red Sox moving to Sarasota's Ed Smith Stadium once its current spring inhabitants, the Cincinnati Reds, move to their new spring home in Goodyear, Arizona.

John Yarborough, director of Lee County Parks and Recreation, met with Jeff Mudgett, a Fort Myers architect who was volunteering his time to brainstorm ideas on what could be done to keep the Red Sox in Fort Myers. "I'd like to have a project by 2012," Yarborough said after the meeting.

On October 28, 2008, the Lee County commission voted 3–1 to approve an agreement with the Boston Red Sox to build a new spring-training facility for the team in south Lee County. On November 1, 2008, the Red Sox signed an agreement with Lee County that would keep their spring training home in the Fort Myers area for 30 more years.

Wednesday, April 30, 2009, the Lee County commissioners selected the Watermen-Pinnacle site on Daniels Parkway, a little more than a mile east of Interstate 75, as the site for the new facility, with a mini-Fenway Park that would open for Spring 2012.

On February 25, 2010, the Boston Red Sox officially released the proposed architectural plans for the new training facility. It was planned as an exact copy of the playing-field dimensions of Fenway Park, including a Green Monster, offering a mix of the old Fenway style and a Floridian and modern style. On March 29, 2011, it was announced that the new stadium would be named JetBlue Park.

References

External links
 Description at RedSox.com
 Site selected for new Sox spring training complex
 Red Sox Reach Deal For New Spring Training Facility in Ft. Myers
 Design of new Red Sox spring training facility slowly taking shape 

Sports venues in Florida
Minor league baseball venues
Boston Red Sox spring training venues
Spring training ballparks
Sports venues in Fort Myers, Florida
Buildings and structures in Fort Myers, Florida
2012 establishments in Florida
Sports venues completed in 2012
Sports complexes in Florida
Fenway Sports Group